The Bahrain national under-23 football team (also known as Bahrain under-23 or Bahrain Olympics team) represents Bahrain in international football competitions, GCC U-23 Championship, Football at the Summer Olympics, as well as other under-23 international football tournaments.

Tournament records

Summer Olympics record 
Since 1992, football at the Summer Olympics changes into Under-23 tournament.

Asian Games record 
Since 2002, football at the Asian Games changes into Under-23 tournament.

AFC U-23 Championship record

GCC U-23 Championship record

Recent fixtures and results

2020

Current squad 
 The following players were called up for the 2022 WAFF U-23 Championship.
 Match dates: 2 – 15 November 2022Caps and goals correct as of:''' 3 November 2022, after the match against

See also 
 Bahrain national football team
 Bahrain national under-17 football team

References 

Asian national under-23 association football teams
Under-23